Flowers Foods, headquartered in Thomasville, Georgia, is a producer and marketer of packed bakery food. The company operates 47 bakeries producing bread, buns, rolls, snack cakes, pastries, and tortillas. Flowers Foods' products are sold regionally through a direct store delivery network that encompasses the East, South, Southwest, West, and the Northwest regions of the United States and are delivered nationwide to retailer's warehouses. It has made acquisitions of a number of bakeries and other food companies over the years, continuing through to the present day. As of February 2013, it had grown to be the "second-largest baking company in the United States".

Flowers Foods has two operating segments: The Direct Store Delivery (DSD) and the Warehouse. The DSD Segment handles fresh bread, buns, rolls, and snack cakes that are sold regionally through a network of independent distributors. The company is continually expanding its market reach through acquisitions and by stretching its current territory. Flowers' Warehouse Segment is responsible for the national distribution of frozen snack cakes, bread, and rolls that are sold directly to the customer's warehouses. Flowers owns the brands Mrs. Freshley's and European Bakers. Mrs. Freshley's produces snack cakes, which are available nationally to retail and vending customers through this segment. The European Bakers brand of frozen specialty bread and rolls are available nationally to retail in-store bakeries and foodservice customers.

History

In 1919, brothers William Howard and Joseph Hampton Flowers opened Flowers Baking Company in Thomasville, Georgia. They made their first acquisition, of Tally Maid bakery, in 1937, and in 1942, became the sixth bakery in the U.S. to franchise Quality Bakers of America’s Sunbeam brand and Little Miss Sunbeam for its white bread.

After acquiring bakeries in Florida, Alabama, and Georgia in the mid-to-late 1960s, the company in 1968 made an initial public offering, changed its name to Flowers Industries and began trading over-the-counter. Less than a year later, Flowers was listed on the American Stock Exchange. In 1982, the company listed on the New York Stock Exchange under the ticker symbol FLO, and the following year was listed for the first time on the Fortune 500 list of the largest U.S. Industrial corporations, at number 470.

Acquisitions
As Flowers Foods, the company has continued acquiring bakeries and other food companies, while it has sold others.

In 1996, Flowers acquired both the Keebler Company and Mrs. Smith's Pies. In 2001, Flowers sold its investment in Keebler to the Kellogg Company; its remaining business units, Flowers Bakeries and Mrs. Smith's Bakeries, were then spun off into a new company called Flowers Foods. In 2002 Flowers Foods restructured into 3 divisions: Flowers Bakeries, Flowers Snack, and Mrs. Smith’s Bakeries.

In late 2002, Flowers purchased Ideal Baking Company, and bought Bishop Baking Company from Kellogg Company, giving the company a presence in north Arkansas, southern Missouri, and parts of Tennessee including Memphis.

The 3-division era did not last long. In 2003, Flowers sold its Mrs. Smith's frozen dessert business to the Schwan Food Company. Flowers renamed the  Flowers Snack division, yielding 2 divisions: Flowers Bakeries and Flowers Specialty.

Royal Cake Company was purchased in September 2005, and Flowers continued to operate the bakery in Winston-Salem, North Carolina. In February 2006, Flowers acquired Derst Baking Co. of Savannah, Georgia, though it continued to operate under its name as part of Flowers Foods Bakeries Group.

In 2008, Flowers acquired both ButterKrust Bakery in Lakeland, Florida, and Holsum Bakery in Phoenix. The following year, the company purchased Leo's Foods, which makes tortillas.

Acquisitions continued in the second decade of the 21st century. Philadelphia-based snack cake baker Tastykake was acquired in 2011, expanding the company's markets into the mid-Atlantic region, and in 2012 it purchased Lepage Bakeries in Maine and acquired assets and licenses from Bimbo Bakeries for Sara Lee and Earthgrains brands in California and Oklahoma City. The company purchased most of the bread brands of Hostess Brands, including Wonder Bread, plus 20 closed Hostess bakeries, in 2013.

Three further bread acquisitions were made In 2015. Flowers Foods purchased Dave's Killer Bread of Milwaukie, Oregon, for $275 million in cash; bought Alpine Valley Bread Co., an organic bakery in Mesa, Arizona; and purchased the North American rights to the Roman Meal trademark for bread, buns, and rolls.

At the end of 2018, Flowers Foods bought Canyon Bakehouse, a privately held gluten-free bread company based in Johnstown, Colorado. Including the Canyon Bakehouse purchase, at that point the company had acquired 16 companies since 2003.

See also
 List of brand name breads

Sources

External links

 

Bakeries of the United States
Brand name breads
Snack food manufacturers of the United States
Companies based in Thomas County, Georgia
Companies listed on the New York Stock Exchange
Food and drink companies established in 1919
1919 establishments in Georgia (U.S. state)